Pachygnatha degeeri  is a spider in the family of long-jawed orb weavers (Tetragnathidae).

Location 
Pachygnatha degeeri is found in Europe.

Appearance 
Pachygnatha  has a dark body, without a dark middle band. The legs are light, yellow-orange. The back can vary in colour and pattern. The back is split in two into an abdomen and a front body (prosoma or cephalothorax). In front of the head are eight eyes. An adult female (imago) is around 4.5 mm, while a male is 4 mm long (body length).

There are two other species, P. listeri and P. clercki in the family Pachygnatha. These can be separated from this species by the dark head. There is also a darker line on the body.

Life 
Pachygnatha degeeri can be found in woods, among plants and grant. Adults can be seen from the middle of the summer until the first frosts in winter.

Literature 
 W. Nentwig, A. Hänggi, C. Kropf & T. Blick (Hrsg.): Spinnen Mitteleuropas – Bestimmungsschlüssel, slekten (gattung) Pachygnatha (tysk)

References

External links 
Pachygnatha degeeri - europspiders.com (Images)
Kjeveedderkopper - edderkopper.net (Norwegian)

Tetragnathidae
Spiders of Europe
Spiders described in 1830